Jabban (Malakand-I) Hydropower Plant (MHPP-I) is a small, low-head, run-of-the-river hydroelectric power generation station of 22 megawatt generation capacity (four units of 5.5 MW each), located at Jabban, Malakand District, KPK province of Pakistan on the flows of Swat River and about 210 km from Pakistan's Capital Islamabad, 45 km from the city of Mardan and 7 km upstream of 20 MW Dargai Hydropower Plant (Malakand-II). It is a small hydel power generating plant constructed and put in commercial operation in July 1938 generating Average Annual yield of 122 million units (GWh) of least expensive electricity.

Old Jabban Power Station
Since its commissioning in 1937 with an initial installed capacity of 9.6 MW (3 units of 3.2 MW each), and addition of 10 MW (2 units of 5.0 MW each), Jabban Hydro electric Power Station generated 5783.314 Gwh of cheap electricity till last day of its operation of Nov 12, 2011.

Fire incident
The 70-year-old power house was badly damaged due to a fire incident on 12-11-2006. The extent of damage was such that it was not possible to restore operation of the existing units. Moreover, the plant equipment had already outlived its life. The situation necessitated to carry out Rehabilitation of Jabban Hydroelectric Power Station on "Fast Track Basis" by installation of new machines of higher efficiency at the same site.

The Rehabilitation of the hydropower station was completed in 2013 with a total cost of Rs3.8 billion by the contractor HRL-CCPG JV (Habib Rafique Ltd. (Pakistan) & Central China Power Group China).

Salient technical features
 Installed capacity: 22 MW (4 Units of 5.5 MW each)
 Annual net electrical output: 122 GWh 
 Design discharge: 34 m3/s (8.5 m3/s per unit) 
 Rated net: head 76.8 m
 Generation voltage: 11 kV
 Transmission voltage: 132 kV

See also 

 List of dams and reservoirs in Pakistan
 List of power stations in Pakistan
 Satpara Dam
 Gomal Zam Dam
 Duber Khwar hydropower project

References 

Dams completed in 1938
Energy infrastructure completed in 1938
Dams in Pakistan
Hydroelectric power stations in Pakistan
Run-of-the-river power stations